Oscar Hilt Tatum, Jr. (born April 22, 1934) is an American dentist notable for being the first clinician to perform a sinus lift procedure.

Education and career
Tatum graduated from the now defunct Emory University Dental School in 1957.
He had several University faculty appointments in the USA and for 25 years was on the faculty of The Lille University School of medicine in France. He served as President of both the American Academy of Implant Dentistry and the American Board of Oral Implantology/Implant Dentistry. On June 16, 2003, he was awarded The French Legion of Honour by President Jacques Chirac in Paris, France. Following this, he established a training course in Birmingham, England where he trained multiple dentists on how to expand bone, place implants and graft sinuses. He continued to work into his eighth decade.

References

American dentists
1934 births
Living people